Nymphargus rosada is a species of frog in the family Centrolenidae, formerly placed in Cochranella. It is endemic to Colombia where it is known from the eastern slopes of the Cordillera Central. Its natural habitats are sub-Andean forests alongside streams. It is threatened by habitat fragmentation and loss caused by agricultural expansion, timber extraction, and water pollution.

Nymphargus rosada are relatively small frogs: adult males measure  in snout–vent length. The skin of the dorsum is finely shagreen with small pustules. Vomerine teeth are absent.

References

rosada
Amphibians of Colombia
Endemic fauna of Colombia
Taxonomy articles created by Polbot
Amphibians described in 1997